The Soo Line Rail Bridge (Blanchard Dam) is a steel deck truss bridge, built by the Minneapolis, St. Paul and Sault Ste. Marie Railway in 1909.  The bridge crosses the Mississippi River northeast of Bowlus, Minnesota.  The rail line was abandoned in 1993, and converted to a pedstrian/bicycle bridge as part of the Soo Line Recreation Trail in 2007.  The bridge is directly downstream of the Blanchard Dam.

See also 

 List of crossings of the Upper Mississippi River

References

External links 

 

Bridges over the Mississippi River
Bridges completed in 1909
Railroad bridges in Minnesota
Soo Line Railroad